The 2011 FIVB Volleyball World League qualification was a qualification tournament to determine the final two spots for the 2011 World League. It was held from 6 to 29 August 2010.

Teams

Pool standing procedure
 Match points
 Number of matches won
 Points ratio
 Sets ratio
 Result of the last match between the tied teams

Match won 3–0 or 3–1: 3 match points for the winner, 0 match points for the loser
Match won 3–2: 2 match points for the winner, 1 match point for the loser

First round
All times are local.

Leg 1

Leg 2

Second round
All times are local.

Leg 1

Leg 2

External links
Official website

FIVB Volleyball World League
2011
FIVB World League